Guingan  is a town and sub-prefecture in the Koundara Prefecture in the Boké Region of northern Guinea, near the border of Senegal. As of 2014 it had a population of 14,347 people.

References

Sub-prefectures of the Boké Region